Ernest "Ernie" Thompson (birth unknown – death unknown) was an English professional rugby league footballer who played in the 1930s.

Playing career

International honours
Ernie Thompson won a cap for England while at Broughton Rangers in the 2-3 defeat by Wales at Taff Vale Park, Pontypridd on Saturday 7 November 1936.

County honours
Ernie Thompson won cap(s) for Yorkshire while at Wakefield Trinity.

Notable tour matches
Ernie Thompson played  in Wakefield Trinity's 6-17 defeat by Australia in the 1933–34 Kangaroo tour of Great Britain match during the 1933–34 season at  Belle Vue, Wakefield on Saturday 28 October 1933.

Club career
Ernie Thompson made his début for Wakefield Trinity during December 1932, he appears to have scored no drop-goals (or field-goals as they are currently known in Australasia), but prior to the 1974–75 season all goals, whether; conversions, penalties, or drop-goals, scored 2-points, consequently prior to this date drop-goals were often not explicitly documented, therefore '0' drop-goals may indicate drop-goals not recorded, rather than no drop-goals scored. In addition, prior to the 1949–50 season, the archaic field-goal was also still a valid means of scoring points.

References

Broughton Rangers players
England national rugby league team players
English rugby league players
Place of birth missing
Place of death missing
Rugby league halfbacks
Wakefield Trinity players
Year of birth missing
Year of death missing
Yorkshire rugby league team players